Bradley Paul Walker (born 25 April 1996) is an English professional footballer who plays as a defensive midfielder for  club Tranmere Rovers.

Walker began his career at Hartlepool United, turning professional in July 2013 and making his first-team debut the following month. He made 123 appearances in all competitions for the club over the next four seasons, before joining Crewe Alexandra in July 2017. He spent the 2018–19 season on loan at Wrexham in the National League despite switching from Crewe to Shrewsbury Town in January 2019. Finding first-team games hard to come by in the 2019–20 season, he began 2020–21 in good form before being sidelined with a serious ankle injury. Released by Shrewsbury, he signed with Port Vale in June 2021. He spent 18 months with the club, before being sold on to Tranmere Rovers in January 2023.

Early and personal life
Walker was born in Billingham, County Durham and attended Northfield School & Sports College. He joined Hartlepool United at the age of 13 and would make the 12-mile round trip to Victoria Park on his bicycle.

Club career

Hartlepool United
He signed a professional contract with Hartlepool United in July 2013. He made his Football League debut on 3 August 2013, in a 3–0 defeat away at Rochdale. He scored his first career goal in a 1–1 draw with Burton Albion on 21 December. He said it was a "very bizarre feeling and one I was very proud with". Having scored 3 goals in 42 appearances, Walker won the Football League Apprentice of the Year award for League Two in the 2013–14 season; upon winning the award he thanked his friends and family for their support. Hartlepool manager Colin Cooper rated him as the best player he had seen for his age.

The 2014–15 season saw a loss of form for Walker and most of the Hartlepool team in general, with manager Colin Cooper and his successor Paul Murray both dismissed before Christmas. He ended the season with 5 goals from 32 games. Walker then fell out of manager Ronnie Moore's first-team plans in the 2015–16 season and spent time on trial at Wolverhampton Wanderers; no move to Wolves transpired though he continued to be linked to the club as late as summer 2017. Though not named in new manager Craig Hignett's first matchday squads in February, he was soon reintroduced to the first team after impressing in training, with Hignett crediting his upturn in form to "love", saying "Brad knows what I think of him and I just felt in training that he was starting to be his old self again". He would go on to feature in 27 competitive matches by the end of the season.

Walker did not play a league game in the first half of the 2016–17 season, despite Hignett hinting at a possible inclusion in November. He earned his first start of the season under caretaker-manager Sam Collins in January, being named as man of the match in a win over Stevenage, and retained his first-team place under new manager Dave Jones. He also filled in at centre-back following an injury crisis in defence, earning him praise from Jones. He turned down the offer of a new contract from newly appointed manager Craig Harrison following the club's relegation out of the Football League at the end of the season and was linked with moves to Wolverhampton Wanderers and Wigan Athletic. In total, he scored 10 goals in 123 appearances for Hartlepool.

Crewe Alexandra
Walker signed a two-year deal to join Crewe Alexandra, after the League Two club paid Hartlepool an undisclosed compensation package on 4 July 2017. He scored his first goal for the club in a 2–1 win over Rotherham United on 4 November, in an FA Cup first round tie at Gresty Road. He scored his first league goal for Crewe in a 2–0 home win over Grimsby Town on 1 January 2018. His first season at the club was described as "mixed" as he started well but transitioned from central midfield to centre-back and ended the campaign finding gametime limited after struggling with injury problems. Walker said that he found it difficult to move away from his hometown club as his partner was expecting a child.

Walker joined National League club Wrexham on a six-month loan starting on 30 August 2018. He scored his first goal for the club with a penalty in a 1–1 draw at Chesterfield on 27 October. Walker said that he was enjoying his football at the Racecourse Ground and that "I lost all interest in it really" after falling out of favour at Crewe earlier in the year. However, Crewe manager David Artell commented that if Wrexham wanted to keep Walker they would have to sign him permanently as he otherwise expected the player to return to Cheshire in January with "fire in his belly". Walker did not return though as he was sold on to a new club whilst his loan spell was ongoing.

Shrewsbury Town
On 9 January 2019, Walker signed for Shrewsbury Town, and was loaned back to Wrexham for the remainder of the 2018–19 season. He was brought to the New Meadow by Sam Ricketts, who had managed Wrexham in the first half of the season, whilst Wrexham were now managed by his former assistant Graham Barrow. The loan spell was ended early in March after he picked up a hamstring injury; he had made a total of 32 appearances for Wrexham, scoring 4 goals. Walker finally made his debut for Shrewsbury on 10 August, the second game of the 2019–20 season, coming on as a 79th-minute substitute during a 1–0 defeat at Milton Keynes Dons. He scored his first goal for Shrewsbury in a 3–1 home win over Macclesfield Town in an EFL Trophy tie on 13 November. He scored 2 goals in 23 appearances throughout the season, which was curtailed early due to the COVID-19 pandemic in England.

After working hard on his fitness during England's first COVID-19 lockdown, he finally forced his way into the starting eleven following injuries to David Edwards and Sean Goss. He was described as "Sam Ricketts' surprise package" in the early stages of the 2020–21 season after putting in a series of strong performances and said he had regained his confidence after a difficult initial season at the club. Ricketts was dismissed and Walker injured his ankle in new manager Steve Cotterill's first game and was sidelined for three months. Walker left Shrewsbury at the end of the season, following the expiry of his contract.

Port Vale
On 2 June 2021, Walker agreed a two-year deal with League Two club Port Vale, becoming Darrell Clarke's first signing as manager. He started the first five league games of the 2021–22 season before he struggled with a knee injury, which required an injection and time to heal. He returned to the midfield three upon his recovery, though was also asked to play in the middle of a central defensive three at times due to his expansive passing range. He was praised by acting manager Andy Crosby for his performances towards the end of the campaign. He scored his first goal for the "Valiants" on 9 April, as his "stunning long-range winner" secured a 3–2 win over Oldham Athletic at Vale Park. The club were promoted into League One at the end of the season via the play-offs, with Walker playing 28 league games and scoring once. However, due to strong competition in the central midfield area, he was limited to four league starts and six other appearances in the first half of the 2022–23 season. Speaking upon his departure in January 2023, director of football David Flitcroft said that "Brad is a player that wants game time and wants minutes... he hasn't been getting the game time he wants due to the form of other players". He had been linked with a return to Hartlepool United, which was a rumour dismissed by manager Keith Curle.

Tranmere Rovers
On 12 January 2023, Walker joined EFL League Two side Tranmere Rovers for an undisclosed fee, signing a two-and-a-half-year contract; manager Micky Mellon said that "for a while we've been looking for players of Brad's size and physicality in the midfield areas".

International career
Walker was called up for England under-18s training camps in November and December 2013. However, he was not called up for the under-18's next fixture in February 2014.

Style of play
Walker is a defensive, ball-playing central midfielder, though can also play as part of a three at centre-back. He has strength and athleticism, as well as good ball control, long-range shooting and passing skills. He is a good free kick taker and is able to emulate the knuckleball dead ball technique.

Career statistics

Honours
Individual
Football League Apprentice of the Year (League Two): 2013–14

References

1996 births
Living people
People from Billingham
Footballers from County Durham
English footballers
Association football midfielders
Hartlepool United F.C. players
Crewe Alexandra F.C. players
Wrexham A.F.C. players
Shrewsbury Town F.C. players
Port Vale F.C. players
Tranmere Rovers F.C. players
English Football League players
National League (English football) players